USS Trefoil has been the name of two ships of the United States Navy.

 , a wooden-hulled screw steamboat purchased by the Navy and used for approximately six months
 , the lead ship of the Trefoil-class concrete barges

United States Navy ship names